Home, James can refer to:

 Home, James (1928 film), a 1928 film
 Home, James (2014 film), a 2014 film
 Home James!, a British television comedy